William T. Cavanaugh (born 1962) is an American Roman Catholic theologian, known for his work in political theology and Christian ethics.

Biography 
Cavanaugh received his Bachelor of Arts degree in theology from the University of Notre Dame in 1984, and a Master of Arts degree from the University of Cambridge in 1987. He later attended Duke University, where he received a Doctor of Philosophy degree in religion in 1996. His areas of specialization are in political theology, economic ethics, and ecclesiology.

Cavanaugh taught at the University of St. Thomas in Minnesota for 15 years. He also spent two years working in Santiago, Chile. In 2010, he was appointed to DePaul University, where he is currently professor of Catholic studies and director of the Center for World Catholicism and Intercultural Theology, a center studying the Catholic Church in the Global South. 

He has published numerous books and articles, some of which have been translated to several languages. Along with Jim Fodor, Cavanaugh is an editor of the journal Modern Theology.

Publications
Cavanaugh, William. Torture and the Eucharist: Theology, Politics, and the Body of Christ. Oxford: Blackwell Publishing, 1998.
Cavanaugh, William. Theopolitical Imagination. New York: T&T Clark, 2003.
Scott, Peter and William Cavanaugh, eds. The Blackwell Companion to Political Theology. Oxford: Blackwell Publishing, 2004.
Cavanaugh, William. Being Consumed: Economics and Christian Desire. Grand Rapids, Michigan: Eerdmans Publishing, 2008.
Cavanaugh, William. The Myth of Religious Violence: Secular Ideology and the Roots of Modern Conflict. Oxford: Oxford University Press, 2009.
Cavanaugh, William. Migrations of the Holy. Grand Rapids, Michigan: Eerdmans Publishing, 2011.
Cavanaugh, William, Jeffery W. Bailey, and Craig Hovey, eds. An Eerdmans Reader in Contemporary Political Theology. Grand Rapids, Michigan: Eerdmans Publishing, 2012.
Cavanaugh, William. Field Hospital: The Church's Engagement With a Wounded World. Grand Rapids, Michigan: Eerdmans Publishing, 2016.

References

1962 births
20th-century American Roman Catholic theologians
21st-century American Roman Catholic theologians
Alumni of St Edmund's College, Cambridge
Christian theology and politics
DePaul University faculty
Duke University Trinity College of Arts and Sciences alumni
Ecclesiologists
Living people
Political theologians
University of Notre Dame alumni
University of St. Thomas (Minnesota) faculty

World Christianity scholars